Richmond Heights is the name of several places:

Canada
Richmond Heights, Saskatoon, a neighborhood in Saskatchewan

New Zealand
Richmond Heights, Taupo

United States
Richmond Heights, Florida
Richmond Heights, Missouri
Richmond Heights, Ohio
East Richmond Heights, California
Richmond Heights, Richmond, California